William Latham (born 1961) is a British computer artist, most known as the creator of the Organic Art product as well as for creating album covers and artwork for the dance group The Shamen. Latham is the founder of the company Computer Artworks which released the Organic Art product through Time Warner Interactive. Latham has authored a book called Evolutionary Art and Computers together with Stephen Todd, published 1992, based on their work at the IBM(UK) Scientific Centre in Winchester, generating 3-d computer models or organic life forms, using genetic algorithm based techniques to mutate base forms into artistic creations. Since 2007, Latham has been Professor of Computing at Goldsmiths, University of London.

References

External links
 Article about William Latham by Jim McClellen: http://www.nemeton.com/static/nemeton/axis-mutatis/latham.html
 William Latham's home page: http://doc.gold.ac.uk/~mas01whl/index.html
 Thomas Dreher: History of Computer Art Chap. IV.3.2: Evolutionary Art of William Latham and Karl Sims

Living people
1961 births
Computer art
Digital artists
Fractal artists
Digital art